Pablove Black (born Paul Anthony Dixon, 24 October 1950) is a Jamaican reggae musician (keyboards and steel drums), arranger, composer, bandleader, vocalist and producer.

Biography
Pablove started playing piano and steel drums in the mid-1960s and, within six months, made his first television appearance with Pan Master, Kelvin Hart and the all Trinidadian Federal All Star Steel Band. By 1968 he was a member of the UWI Carnival Champions, The Wanderers.

In 1971, Pablove, already exposed to the roots music of the Skatalites, joined the Studio One Crew, (Jamaica's Motown) and, under the watchful eyes of legendary producer Clement "Sir Coxsone" Dodd and jazz greats Jackie Mittoo (keyboards), Ernest Ranglin (guitar), and Roland Alphonso (saxophone), made invaluable contributions playing keyboards, arranging music and doing background vocals with legendary bassman *Earl "Bagga" Walker and the soul defenders for artists like Dennis Brown, Burning Spear, Marcia Griffiths, Freddie McGregor, and Johnny Osbourne. Pablove also worked at the Black Ark Studios of Lee Perry where he collaborated on products for Little Roy (Tribal War), and Junior Byles (Curly Locks), along with Junior Dan (bass) and Benbow (drums).

Since then he has travelled the world with the likes of Jimmy Cliff, Sugar Minnott and many more. Pablove Black is a name well known in the reggae circuit and he can still be heard on the tracks of current reggae stars such as Ras Mikey (ISOULJAHS), Etosi Brooks, Tashiba, Nanko, Kashief Lindo, and 3HOT3HANDLE.

Discography

Singles
High Locks / Soul Locks

Albums 
 Mr. Music Originally (1979)
 Charcoal Charlie (1986)

References

 http://www.roots-archives.com/artist/340

External links
 
 

Jamaican reggae musicians
Jamaican pianists
1950 births
Living people
Musicians from Kingston, Jamaica
21st-century pianists